Radio Gaga was a pop up digital radio station broadcasting nationally in Australia while Lady Gaga  toured the country in 2010. The station was part of Austereo's Today Network and only played Lady Gaga's music.

Programming
The station exclusively played music by Lady Gaga and included her biggest hits, album tracks, live performances and rarities. Tim Lee, an announcer at Fox FM and former host of the Hot30 Countdown, was the host of the station and played interview grabs with Lady Gaga from the Kyle and Jackie O show on 2Day FM. Hamish & Andy talked to people going to the concerts and talked about unknown Lady Gaga trivia.

Due to the "pop up" nature of the station, it was only broadcast in Australia between Monday, 15 March and Monday, 17 May 2010 to coincide with Lady Gaga's Australian Monster Ball tour. After Monday, 17 May 2010, the station became I See Red Radio raising money for the Red Shield Appeal.

Availability
The station was heard on DAB+ radios in Sydney, Melbourne, Brisbane, Adelaide and Perth.

External links
2Day FM Sydney
Fox FM Melbourne
B105 Brisbane
SAFM Adelaide
92.9 Perth

References

Digital radio in Australia
Lady Gaga
Defunct radio stations in Australia
Digital-only radio stations
Contemporary hit radio stations in Australia
Radio stations established in 2010
Radio stations disestablished in 2010